The Francis Marion Jolley House is a historic house at 202 East 200 South in Manti, Utah. It was built around 1875 for Francis Marion Jolley, an immigrant from England who converted to the Church of Jesus Christ of Latter-day Saints and settled in Manti in 1853. Jolley lived here with his wife Chelnecha, and he worked as a farmer and carpenter. The house has been listed on the National Register of Historic Places since October 14, 1980.

Brick walls, three bricks thick, two of adobe and one of fired brick, continue all the way up to top of four dormer windows in second floor, centered above window-door-window-window arrangement on first floor. Small adobe room extending out from rear probably predates the main portion.

The house faces west on a southeast corner, and has address 201 S. 200 East.

References

		
National Register of Historic Places in Sanpete County, Utah
Houses completed in 1875
1875 establishments in Utah Territory